Ray Smith (10 August 1914 – 21 February 1996) was an English cricketer. He played for Essex between 1934 and 1956.

References

External links

1914 births
1996 deaths
English cricketers
East of England cricketers
Essex cricketers
Marylebone Cricket Club cricketers
Players cricketers
North v South cricketers
People from Boreham
Sportspeople from Essex
English cricketers of 1919 to 1945
T. N. Pearce's XI cricketers